Hoko yari is an ancient form of Japanese spear or yari said to be based on a Chinese spear. The hoko yari came into use sometime between the Yayoi period and the Heian period, possibly during the Nara period in the 8th century AD.

Appearance and use
The hoko yari was thought to be a guard's spear used in the defense of palisades and gates. One source describes hoko yari as being mounted on a two meter pole and with an 20 cm blade, either in a leaf shape or with a wavy edge similar to the Malay kris.  Like the later-period fukuro yari, the metal blade had a hollow socket for the pole to fit into, rather than a long tang.  Hoko yari could also have a sickle-shaped horn projecting out and slightly forward on one or both sides of the blade, indicating that this weapon was primarily used to thrust back an enemy.

References

See also
 Amenonuhoko

Spears of Japan